Thomas Patrick Ward (born 15 May 1994) is a British professional boxer. He has held the NABA super-bantamweight title since 2019, and previously held the British super-bantamweight title in 2017.

Career
Born in County Durham in 1994, and based in West Rainton, Ward had a junior amateur record of 60 wins from 64 fights, including winning a gold medal at the European under-17s championship in Ukraine, and was voted Best Junior Boxer by the ABA.

He turned professional at the age of 17 without having any senior amateur fights, and made his professional debut in July 2012 with a points win over Elemir Rafael.

By 2017 he had won 20 straight fights, including wins over former Ghanaian bantamweight champion Isaac Owusu, Nasibu Ramadhan, Everth Briceno, and Robbie Turley, leading to a British title shot.

Ward challenged for Jazza Dickens' British title at the First Direct Arena in Leeds in May 2017. An accidental clash of heads in the ninth round left Ward with a cut above his left eye that caused the fight to be stopped. Ahead on the scorecards at the time, Ward became British champion. He made one successful defence of the title in November, beating Sean Davis by unanimous decision.

Professional boxing record

{|class="wikitable" style="text-align:center"
|-
!
!Result
!Record
!Opponent
!Type
!Round, time
!Date
!Location
!Notes
|-
|35
|Loss
|33–1–1
|style="text-align:left;"| Otabek Kholmatov
|TKO
|5  (12), 
|4 Mar 2023
|style="text-align:left;"| 
|
|-
|34
|Win
|33–0–1
|style="text-align:left;"| Ally Mwerangi
|TKO
|3  (10), 
|17 Jul 2022
| style="text-align:left;"| 
|
|-
|33
|Win
|32–0–1
|style="text-align:left;"| Alexis Boureima Kabore 
|PTS
|10
|25 Mar 2022
|style="text-align:left;"| 
|
|-
|32
|Win
|31–0–1
|style="text-align:left;"| Leonardo Padilla
|UD
|10
|18 Dec 2021
|style="text-align:left;"| 
|
|-
|31
|Win
|30–0–1
|style="text-align:left;"| Edy Valencia Mercado
|UD
|10
|12 Jun 2021
|style="text-align:left;"| 
|
|-
|30
|Draw
|29–0–1
|style="text-align:left;"| Thomas Essomba
|
|8 (10), 
|17 Oct 2020
|style="text-align:left;"| 
|style="text-align:left;"|
|-
|29
|Win
|29–0
|style="text-align:left;"| Martin Casillas 
|UD
|8
|22 Nov 2019
|style="text-align:left;"| 
|
|-
|28
|Win
|28–0
|style="text-align:left;"| Yesner Talavera
|PTS
|10
|28 Sep 2019
|style="text-align:left;"| 
|
|-
|27
|Win
|27–0
|style="text-align:left;"| Brayan Mairena
|PTS
|8
|20 Jul 2019
|style="text-align:left;"| 
|
|-
|26
|Win
|26–0
|style="text-align:left;"| Jesse Angel Hernandez
|UD
|10
|15 Feb 2019
|style="text-align:left;"| 
|style="text-align:left;"|
|-
|25
|Win
|25–0
|style="text-align:left;"| Tom Tran
|KO
|1 (4), 
|13 Oct 2018
|style="text-align:left;"| 
|
|-
|24
|Win
|24–0
|style="text-align:left;"| Alvaro Rodriguez
|UD
|10
|27 Jul 2018
|style="text-align:left;"| 
|style="text-align:left;"|
|-
|23
|Win
|23–0
|style="text-align:left;"| Lesther Cantillano
|TKO
|5 (6), 
|10 Mar 2018
|style="text-align:left;"| 
|
|-
|22
|Win
|22–0
|style="text-align:left;"| Sean Davis
|UD
|12
|11 Nov 2017
|style="text-align:left;"| 
|style="text-align:left;"|
|-
|21
|Win
|21–0
|style="text-align:left;"| Jazza Dickens
|
|9 (12), 
|13 May 2017
|style="text-align:left;"|
|style="text-align:left;"|
|-
|20
|Win
|20–0
|style="text-align:left;"| Simon Volosinas
|PTS
|6
|4 Mar 2017
|style="text-align:left;"| 
|
|-
|19
|Win
|19–0
|style="text-align:left;"| Norbert Kalucza
|
|4 (6), 
|8 Oct 2016
|style="text-align:left;"| 
|
|-
|18
|Win
|18–0
|style="text-align:left;"| Elvis Guillen
|PTS
|6
|10 Jul 2016
|style="text-align:left;"| 
|
|-
|17
|Win
|17–0
|style="text-align:left;"| Robbie Turley
|
|10
|5 Mar 2016
|style="text-align:left;"| 
|
|-
|16
|Win
|16–0
|style="text-align:left;"| Everth Briceno
|PTS
|6
|20 Nov 2015
|style="text-align:left;"| 
|
|-
|15
|Win
|15–0
|style="text-align:left;"| Nasibu Ramadhani
|PTS
|10
|19 Sep 2015
|style="text-align:left;"| 
|
|-
|14
|Win
|14–0
|style="text-align:left;"| Dmitrijs Gutmans
|PTS
|6
|5 Jul 2015
|style="text-align:left;"| 
|
|-
|13
|Win
|13–0
|style="text-align:left;"| Giorgi Gachechiladze
|PTS
|6
|8 Mar 2015
|style="text-align:left;"| 
|
|-
|12
|Win
|12–0
|style="text-align:left;"| Isaac Owusu
|PTS
|6 
|6 Feb 2015
|style="text-align:left;"| 
|
|-
|11
|Win
|11–0
|style="text-align:left;"| Chris Adaway
|PTS
|6
|13 Dec 2014
|style="text-align:left;"| 
|
|-
|10
|Win
|10–0
|style="text-align:left;"| Jamie Quinn
|PTS
|4
|12 Oct 2014
|style="text-align:left;"| 
|
|-
|9
|Win
|9–0
|style="text-align:left;"| Antonio Horvatic
|PTS
|4
|6 Sep 2014
|style="text-align:left;"| 
|
|-
|8
|Win
|8–0
|style="text-align:left;"| Michael Ramabeletsa
|PTS
|6
|7 Jun 2014
|style="text-align:left;"| 
|
|-
|7
|Win
|7–0
|style="text-align:left;"| Qasim Hussain
|PTS
|4
|29 Mar 2014
|style="text-align:left;"| 
|
|-
|6
|Win
|6–0
|style="text-align:left;"| Qasim Hussain
|PTS
|4
|7 Dec 2013
|style="text-align:left;"| 
|
|-
|5
|Win
|5–0
|style="text-align:left;"| Adrian Fuzesi
|PTS
|6
|13 Sep 2013
|style="text-align:left;"| 
|
|-
|4
|Win
|4–0
|style="text-align:left;"| Ben Morrish
|PTS
|4
|7 Jul 2013
|style="text-align:left;"| 
|
|-
|3
|Win
|3–0
|style="text-align:left;"| Delroy Spencer
|PTS
|4
|24 Nov 2012
|style="text-align:left;"| 
|
|-
|2
|Win
|2–0
|style="text-align:left;"| David Lake
|
|4 (4), 
|9 Sep 2012
|style="text-align:left;"| 
|
|-
|1
|Win
|1–0
|style="text-align:left;"| Elemir Rafael
|
|4
|15 Jun 2012
|style="text-align:left;"| 
|

References

External links

1994 births
Living people
English male boxers
Super-bantamweight boxers
Sportspeople from County Durham